Mr. Zoo: The Missing VIP is a 2020 South Korean comedy-drama film written and directed by Kim Tae-yoon. It stars Lee Sung-min, Kim Seo-hyung, Bae Jung-nam and Shin Ha-kyun and was released on January 22, 2020.

Plot
After he hurt his head in an accident, top National Security (NIS) agent Joo Tae-joo is suddenly able to talk to animals. He meets a German shepherd who might be able to help him with his current case.

An accident occurred while guarding the VIP panda 'Ming-Ming', who came as a special envoy from China. In the accident, Tae-Joo injured his head and the VIP disappeared. Fortunately, Tae-Joo is fine, but he is experiencing strange symptoms. That was when the voices of the animals he hated so much began to be heard.

The pets displayed in the supermarket, the fish in the fishbowl of the National Intelligence Service office, and the voices of animals of all kinds were heard, and confusion was about to come when he met Ali, a wandering military dog. Tae-Joo learns that Ali has a clue to the case, and eventually uses his strange symptoms to conduct a joint investigation with Ali.

Cast

Main
 Lee Sung-min as Joo Tae-joo
 Kim Seo-hyung as Min Soo-hee
 Bae Jung-nam as Man-sik
 Shin Ha-kyun as Ali, a German Shepherd (voice)

Supporting
 Kal So-won as Seo-yeon
 David Lee McInnis as Dmitry
 Yoo In-na as Ming-Ming, a Panda (voice)
 Kim Soo-mi as Parrot (voice)
 Lee Sun-kyun as Black goat (voice)
 Lee Jung-eun as Gorilla (voice)
 Lee Soon-jae as Hamster (voice)
 Kim Bo-sung as Pug (voice)
 Joon Park as Eagle (voice)
 Lee Byung-joon as Porcupine (voice)
 Kim Young-jae as Hwang Bo-sung
 Park Hyuk-kwon as Dr. Baek Hoon

Special appearances
 Park Chul-min as bus driver
 Lee Soo-kyung as So-jin

References

External links
 
 

2020 films
2020s Korean-language films
2020 comedy-drama films
South Korean comedy-drama films
Films about giant pandas
Films about animals